Piso Point is a former Japanese naval base throughout World War II which is located at the eastern portion of Davao Gulf, across from Davao City, Philippines.
  It was also a harbor for Japanese suicide boats which had been harassing American shipping in Davao Gulf. During the liberation of the Philippines from the Japanese on May 14, 1945, many of the Japanese suicide boats were annihilated by the U.S. Navy.

History 

During World War II, When the Japanese invaded the southern Philippines, they occupied Davao City and Piso Point. Piso Point is also strategically located at the south with many overhanging trees which allow the Japanese to initiate camouflage attacks against their enemies.

However, in April 1945, The U.S. Army was given the mission to eradicate Japanese troops in Davao City and in both eastern and western portion of Davao Gulf.

On May 10, 1945, Edgar D. Hoagland., Naval commander of the 24th Division of the U.S. army was given a special duty to survey the area for potential Japanese enemies hiding at the Davao valley including Piso Point.  Although commander Hoagland did not witness any suspicious acts at first, he continued to patrol at the north leaving behind the LCI vessel. The LCI vessel was abruptly attacked by Japanese suicide boats. No one could trace the whereabouts of the Japanese suicide boats since these boats remained under camouflage with the aid of numerous overhanging trees and maze inlets.

On May 10, 1945, an anonymous tip from the guerillas brought Commander Edgar D. Hoagland together with his Patrol Torpedo boats at Piso Point once more. There, they have discovered that the Japanese have mastered the art of camouflage so well that they hid their suicide boats under mangroves with green, freshly cut palm leaves that enable them to be unseen at a distance greater than 100 yards. Credits are given to Marine Major Richard E. Maulsby, Pilot of a Marine Mitchell bomber and Marine First Lieutenant Doit L. Fish for discovering the hidden Japanese suicide boats.

Battle at Piso Point 

On May 14, 1945, Edgar D. Hoagland, Naval commander of the 24th Division of the U.S. army together with Ens. John Adams, USNR and their patrol torpedo boats approached Piso Point to destroy the remaining Japanese troops with their suicide boats.  They won the battle against the Japanese troops and destroyed their remaining paraphernalia.

See also
Japanese Special Attack Units

References 

Republic of the Philippines: Department of Environment and Natural Resources, National Mapping and Resource Information Authority
Bureau of Coast and Geodetic Survey, US Army, Map Series 711 compiled in 19 from 1947 to 1953, Photographs, Department of Public Highways and Others.

Pacific war Online Encyclopedia:
http://pwencycl.kgbudge.com/M/i/Mindanao.htm

1945 in the Philippines
Battles and operations of World War II involving the Philippines
Battles of World War II involving Japan
Imperial Japanese Navy
Battles of World War II involving the United States
Conflicts in 1945
South West Pacific theatre of World War II
World War II operations and battles of the Pacific theatre
Headlands of the Philippines
Landforms of Davao Oriental
History of Davao Oriental